La Nouvelle Tribune is a weekly francophone Moroccan newspaper.

History and profile
La Nouvelle Tribune was established in 1995 by Fahd Yata. He is also the owner and director of the paper. The publisher is Impression Presse Edition.

The paper is published weekly on Thursdays.

As of 2016, its total circulation averages 9,010 copies with individual purchase numbers averaging 4,014 copies.

See also
 List of newspapers in Morocco

References

External links
  

1994 establishments in Morocco
French-language newspapers published in Morocco
Newspapers published in Morocco
Publications established in 1994
Socialist newspapers
Weekly newspapers
Mass media in Casablanca